Georgina Hill (14 July 1825 – 22 July 1903) was an English cookery book writer who wrote at least 21 works. She was born in Kingsdown, Bristol before moving to Tadley, Hampshire in the 1850s. She wrote her first cookery book, The Gourmet's Guide to Rabbit Cooking there in 1859. Within a year she was writing for the Routledge Household Manuals series of books, and she produced several works that specialised on an ingredient, type of food or method of cooking. Her books appear to have sold well, and were advertised in India and the US. Her 1862 work Everybody's Pudding Book was republished as A Year of Victorian Puddings in 2012.

For much of the twentieth century Hill's identity and work was conflated with that of her namesake, Georgiana Hill, the social historian, journalist and women's rights activist.

Life

Georgina Hill was born on 14 July 1825 in Kingsdown, Bristol; her father was George Hill, a civil engineer and her mother was Sophia Pitson, ( Edgar). Little is known about Hill's early life. In 1851 she was living in Exmouth, Devon, and teaching languages; her sister, Sophie, also lived in the town, teaching singing. At some point in the 1850s both sisters, who remained unmarried throughout their lives, moved to Browning Hill, near Tadley, Hampshire.

In 1859 Hill wrote her first cookery book, The Gourmet's Guide to Rabbit Cooking, which was published under the pseudonym "An Old Epicure". The book divides the recipes into methods of preparation, and comprises rabbit prepared boiled, roast, baked, in pies, puddings, soups, curried, broiled, fried, fricasseed, stewed, served cold and warmed. She wrote in the preface:

And why should I not, as a good gastronomer, publish some of my experiences in the 'social science' of cookery? ... Nor do I deem it to be a derogation of my dignity to take up my pen in favour of so gracious a subject ... So, then, am I right ... [to] put on armour (my apron) for the advancement of the ars coquinari?

The Gourmet's Guide to Rabbit Cooking was reviewed in The Globe and described as "a curiosity in its way" as it taught cooks "how to make cheap dishes that are not nasty".

In 1860 Hill wrote The Cook's Own Book, part of the Routledge's Household Manuals series of books. A volume of 64 pages and at a price of sixpence, it was described in the London City Press as having "the double merit of being cheap and simple; so simple that the most unskilful in the culinary art may ... serve up a savoury meal to please the most fastidious palate". The reviewer for the Leeds Intelligencer thought the work would be beneficial to those "who wish to instruct the ignorant in a good system of cookery", as the work "is not a mere collection of 'receipts', but it is a short treatise on cookery, in which practical instructions of great value are given".

Hill wrote extensively for Household Manuals series, producing a series of works that specialised on an ingredient—such as apples, potatoes, fish, game, vegetables or onions—or type of food—cakes, salads, soups and sweet and savoury puddings—or method of cooking—stew, hash and curry, pickles and preserves. The historian Rachel Rich, Hill's biographer in the Dictionary of National Biography, observes that Hill's approach was that of the "specialist and expert" when the style of cookery book publishing was towards that of the compendium, as was seen with 1861 publication of Isabella Beeton's Book of Household Management. The food historian Sarah Freeman notes that the canon of Hill's work taken together is an equivalent to the compendium.

After she stayed at the house of an old lady who had apple puddings for six months of the year, then changed to gooseberry desserts for the other half of the year, Hill wrote Everybody's Pudding Book in 1862. She structured the work into monthly sections rather than type or style of the dish. Each chapter provides information about the month in question, and the best dishes to prepare with the seasonal produce. The book was republished as A Year of Victorian Puddings in 2012.

Hill was employed as a ward sister at Guy's Hospital, London in 1871, but had returned to Browning Hill a few years later. She died there on 22 July 1903.

Hill's books appear to have sold well, and were advertised for sale in the US and India; in 1869 an American publication comprising four of her works was published under the name How to Cook Potatoes, Apples, Eggs and Fish. Four Hundred Different Ways. Many of Hill's works show the influence of European cuisines on the English one; recipes for French, Spanish and Italian dishes are included, although it is not known if she travelled to gain the experience of the dishes, or read widely. Rich notes that the books show the hand of an educated and erudite writer who understood French and Italian, could write about the apple in classical mythology and also about modern manners.

Identity
For much of the twentieth century Hill's identity and work was conflated with that of her namesake, Georgiana Hill, the social historian, journalist and women's rights activist: the historian Joan Thirsk, in her introduction to Women in English Society, 1500–1800 (1985) discusses the social historian as having "extraordinary success as an author [that] started with her cookery books which sold cheaply ... and in very large numbers". In some cases Hill's name was confused with her place of residence, and she is named Browning Hill. In 2014 Rich wrote the entry for Georgiana Hill (the cookery book writer) for inclusion in the Dictionary of National Biography.

Works

 The Gourmet's Guide to Rabbit Cooking, in One Hundred and Twenty-Four Dishes (1859) 
 The Cook's Own Book: a Manual of Cookery for the Kitchen and Cottage (1860) 
 Foreign Desserts for English Tables: A Calendar for the Use of Hosts and Housekeepers (1862) 
 Everybody's Pudding Book (1862) 
 The Lady's Dessert Book: A Calendar for the Use of Hosts and Housekeepers (1863) 
 How to Cook Apples, Shown in a Hundred Different Ways of Dressing that Fruit (1864) 
 The Breakfast Book (1865) 
 Upwards of a Hundred Ways of Dressing and Serving Potatoes (1866) 
 How to Cook or Serve Eggs: In a Hundred Different Ways (1866) 
 How to Cook Fish in Upwards of a Hundred Different Ways (1866) 
 How to Cook Game in a Hundred Different Ways (1867) 
 Cakes: How to Make Them A Hundred Different Ways (1867) 
 Onions Dressed and Served in a Hundred Different Ways (1867) 
 How to Dress Salads; Shown in a Hundred Different Ways (1867) 
 How to Preserve Fruit in a Hundred Different Ways (1867) 
 Soups: How to Make them in More than a Hundred Different Ways (1867) 
 How to Cook Vegetables in One Hundred Different Ways (1868) 
 How to Stew, Hash and Curry Cold Meat and Fish in a Hundred Different Ways (1868) 
 How to Cook Potatoes, Apples, Eggs and Fish: Four Hundred Different Ways (1869) 
 Pickles: How to Make Them in a Hundred Different Ways (1870) 
 How to Cook Meat, Fruit and Sweet Puddings, in Upwards of Two Hundred Ways (1870)

Notes and references

Notes

References

Sources

 
 
 
 
 
 
 
 
 
 
 
 

English food writers
English women non-fiction writers
Writers from Bristol
1825 births
1903 deaths
Women cookbook writers
19th-century English women writers
20th-century English women writers
20th-century English non-fiction writers
Women food writers
19th-century British non-fiction writers
People from Tadley